Robert Lindstedt and Horia Tecău were the defending champions but Lindstedt decided not to participate.
Tecău plays alongside Max Mirnyi and won the title beating in the final Andre Begemann and Martin Emmrich, 6–3, 7–6(7–4).

Seeds

Draw

Draw

References
 Main Draw

Topshelf Openandnbsp;- Doubles
2013 Doubles